Thérèse King (15 July 1934 in Ziguinchor  – 16 April 2015 in Dakar) was a Senegalese politician. She was the Minister of Public Health from April 5th, 1988 to March 27th, 1990 under the presidency of Abdou Diouf. She was one of the first women government ministers in Senegal, and the second female Minister of Public Health after Marie Sarr Mbodj.

She also chaired the Ziguinchor Regional Union of Socialist Women.

In 2010, she was made a Grand Cross of the National Order of the Lion.

References

Further reading
 

21st-century Senegalese women politicians
21st-century Senegalese politicians
Women government ministers of Senegal
Public health ministers
1934 births
2015 deaths
People from Ziguinchor
20th-century Senegalese women politicians
20th-century Senegalese politicians
Health ministers of Senegal
Recipients of orders, decorations, and medals of Senegal